"One Minute More" is a song by American indie pop duo Capital Cities, written and produced by band members Ryan Merchant and Sebu Simonian. It was first released as a stand-alone digital single on April 14, 2011, and was later included on the deluxe edition of their debut studio album In a Tidal Wave of Mystery (2013). The song impacted modern rock radio in the United States on March 25, 2014, serving as the fourth single from the album. The song appeared in 2013 film Iron Man 3 and the 2014 film The Giver.

Music video
The official music video for "One Minute More" was directed by Brewer and released on June 19, 2014. The video's primary theme is "the idea of balancing joy and sorrow", and depicts the band performing the song amongst a party of jet skiers, intertwined with scenes of a woman tearfully dealing with a divorce.

Charts

Weekly charts

Year-end charts

Release history

References

External links 
Youtube video

2011 singles
2014 singles
Capital Cities (band) songs
Capitol Records singles
2011 songs